Yucatan is an unincorporated community in eastern Callaway County, Missouri, United States. The community is on Missouri Route D about four miles south of I-70. Lake Lochaweeno is about two miles to the southwest.

A post office called Yucatan was established in 1892, and remained in operation until 1908. The community was named after the nearby Yucatan Baptist Church.

Notes

Unincorporated communities in Callaway County, Missouri
Unincorporated communities in Missouri
Jefferson City metropolitan area